Pranjal Prakash Bhumij (born 2 March 1999) is an Indian professional footballer who plays as a forward for I-League club RoundGlass Punjab, on loan from Indian Super League club Mumbai City.

Although Pranjal prefers playing as a striker, he can also play as a winger on either side and as an attacking midfielder.

Career

DSK Shivajians
A youth product for DSK Shivajians, Bhumij made his professional debut for the first-team in the I-League on 26 February 2017 against Churchill Brothers. He came off the bench in the 60th minute for Naro Hari Shrestha as DSK Shivajians fell 3–0. He then scored his first professional goal for the club on 8 April 2017 against Shillong Lajong. He scored the equalizing goal for the club in the 63rd minute but despite that, Shillong Lajong scored a third in stoppage time to win 3–2.

Mumbai City
On 23 July 2017, Pranjal was picked up by Mumbai City FC as a developmental player for 2017-18 Hero ISL season. He committed to Mumbai City FC by signing a contract with the club till 2024.

International career
In August 2017, Pranjal was called by India U19 coach Floyd Pinto before SAFF U19 Championship. Pranjal made his debut for India U19 against Nepal in Bhutan.

Career statistics

Club

References

External links 
 DSK Shivajians Football Club Profile.

1999 births
Living people
People from Sivasagar
Footballers from Assam
Indian footballers
DSK Shivajians FC players
Association football forwards
I-League players
Indian Super League players
Mumbai City FC players
India youth international footballers
Bhumij people